Günther Wilke (23 February 1925 – 9 December 2016) was a German chemist who was influential in organometallic chemistry.  He was the director of the Max Planck Institute for Coal Research (Max-Planck-Institut für Kohlenforschung) from 1967–1992, succeeding Karl Ziegler in that post.  During Wilke's era, the MPI made several discoveries and achieved some financial independence from patents and a gift from the Ziegler family.  The institute continued as a center of excellence in organometallic chemistry.

Wilke's own area of interest focused on homogeneous catalysis by nickel complexes. His group discovered or developed several compounds including Ni(1,5-cyclooctadiene)2, Ni(allyl)2, Ni(C2H4)3.  Some of these complexes are useful catalysts for the oligomerization of dienes. He died in 2016 at the age of 91.

Honours and awards
 Seven honorary doctorates
 corresponding member of the math and science class abroad
 Wilhelm Exner Medal in 1980.
 Former Vice President of the Max Planck Society (1978-1990)
 Member of the North Rhine-Westphalian Academy of Science (President 1994-1997)
 Member of the German Academy of Sciences Leopoldina, Halle
 Member of the Academia Europaea
 Foreign member of the Royal Netherlands Academy of Arts and Sciences (1977)
 Austrian Decoration for Science and Art
 President of the German Chemical Society (Gesellschaft Deutscher Chemiker)
 Chairman of the Society of German Scientists and Physicians
 Grand Cross of the Order of Merit of the Federal Republic of Germany (1987)

References

See also:
https://web.archive.org/web/20080529173702/http://www.mpi-muelheim.mpg.de/kofo/english/institut/geschichte_e.html

1925 births
2016 deaths
20th-century German chemists
Knights Commander of the Order of Merit of the Federal Republic of Germany
Recipients of the Austrian Decoration for Science and Art
Members of Academia Europaea
Members of the European Academy of Sciences and Arts
Members of the Royal Netherlands Academy of Arts and Sciences
Scientists from Heidelberg
Presidents of the German Chemical Society
Max Planck Institute directors